Marston Glacier is a glacier in Antarctica, draining eastward from Mount Marston and Doublefinger Peak and entering Granite Harbour between Dreikanter Head and the Kar Plateau. The New Zealand Northern Survey Party of the Commonwealth Trans-Antarctic Expedition (1956–58) ascended this glacier en route to Mount Marston in October 1957, and named it for its proximity to that mountain.

References

Glaciers of Victoria Land
Scott Coast